Khasanov or Khassanov is a masculine surname.

People 
 Abdusalom Khasanov, amateur boxer from Tajikistan
 Ibragim Khasanov, Soviet sprint canoer
 Numon Khasanov, Uzbekistani footballer
 Murat Khasanov, Russian Sambist and Judoka
 Rushan Khasanov, Russian footballer
 Roman Khassanov, Kazakhstani tennis player